Jimmy Coco (born 28 November 1972) is a retired French hurdler who specialized in the 400 metres hurdles.

He competed at the 1995 World Championships, the 1997 World Championships, the 1997 Summer Universiade and the 1998 European Championships without reaching the final. He also took a silver medal in the 4 x 400 metres relay at the 1997 Mediterranean Games.

He became French champion in 1995 and 1998.

His personal best time was 49.29 seconds, achieved in June 1998 in Saint-Denis.

References

1972 births
Living people
French male hurdlers
World Athletics Championships athletes for France
Mediterranean Games silver medalists for France
Mediterranean Games medalists in athletics
Athletes (track and field) at the 1997 Mediterranean Games